Potskhetseri (Georgian ფოცხოეწერი) is a village near the Enguri Dam in the Tsalenjikha Municipality of Samegrelo-Zemo Svaneti region of western Georgia. It previously had an aerial lift to bring workers up to the dam. Situated 22 km east of the city Tsalenjikha.

References

Populated places in Samegrelo-Zemo Svaneti